Corporate sponsorship of major English football competitions dates back to the early 1980s, although minor competitions such as the Watney Cup and Texaco Cup were sponsored during the early 1970s.

Sponsorship deals
The first tournament for English Football League clubs to sell its naming rights was the Watney Cup, sponsored by brewer Watney Mann which was played from 1970 to 1973.

The 1970-71 season saw the Ford Sporting League, sponsored by the Ford Motor Company, take place for the first and only time, and also the start of the Texaco Cup (sponsored by Texaco) which was played until 1975.

The first major English competition to negotiate a sponsorship deal was the League Cup, negotiating a £2 million deal in 1982 with the National Dairy Council. It became known as the "Milk Cup" and has since adopted the name of its sponsors in this same way.

The following season in 1983 the Football League negotiated a sponsorship deal with Canon worth £3.3 million over 3 years. Cardiff City became the first second division club to sign a sponsorship deal and carried the “SuperTed” flash which became an iconic collectors item and replica shirts are still sold to this day. Since the formation of the breakaway Premier League in 1992, the competition has struck up its own sponsorship deals separately from the Football League (though it was unsponsored in its first season after a $17.1 million agreement with Bass Brewery was vetoed by Arsenal, Liverpool and Nottingham Forest).

The last major English competition to negotiate a sponsorship deal was in fact its oldest, the FA Cup. The competition was sponsored by Littlewoods for four seasons, starting in 1994 in a deal with £14 million. In 1998, AXA Insurance started their sponsorship of the competition for four seasons. It was always carefully named, being the "AXA-sponsored FA Cup", or the "FA Cup sponsored by AXA", and never the "AXA Cup". From 2002–03 through 2005–06, the FA Cup did not have a dedicated sponsor, but instead shared the team of sponsors of The Football Association. From 2006 to 2011, the FA Cup was known as "The FA Cup sponsored by E.ON" due to a deal with energy company E.ON. From the 2011–12 season to the 2013–14 season, the FA Cup was sponsored by Budweiser Beer and known as the FA Cup with Budweiser.

Summary of competition sponsorship deals

Summary of Premier League front of shirt sponsorship deals
Shirt sponsorship in English football clubs was first pioneered by Coventry City in 1974 after they were sponsored by Talbot.

The first English club to secure a sponsorship deal was Derby County, they only wore the football tops featuring the Saab sponsor once for a photo shoot.

Issues arose with teams wearing sponsored shirts in the early 1980s. The scheduled broadcast of a match between Aston Villa and Brighton & Hove Albion on 22 October 1980 was cancelled as both teams refused to play without sponsors on their shirts. Newcastle United and Bolton Wanderers were fined £1,000 for wearing shirts with advertising in FA Cup games in January 1981. Nottingham Forest were fined £7,000 by UEFA for a similar offence in February 1981.

By 1987, every league club had a shirt sponsorship deal.

Summary of kit manufacturer deals

References

External links
Branding, sponsorship and commerce in football Centre for the Sociology of Sport, University of Leicester (archived 21 June 2007)

Sponsorship
Sports sponsorships